Nguyễn Linh Chi (born July 31, 1990) is a retired Vietnamese volleyball player of the Vietnam women's national volleyball team.

Clubs 
  Bộ Tư lệnh Thông tin - FLC

Awards

Individuals 
2015 VTV Binh Dien International Cup "Best Setter"
2015 VTV International Cup "Miss Volleyball"
2018 VTV International Cup "Best Setter"

Clubs
 2010 Vietnam League -  Champion, with Thông tin Liên Việt Bank
 2011 Vietnam League -  Runner-Up, with Thông tin Liên Việt Post Bank
 2012 Vietnam League -  Champion, with Thông tin Liên Việt Post Bank
 2013 Vietnam League -  Champion, with Thông tin Liên Việt Post Bank
 2014 Vietnam League -  Champion, with Thông tin Liên Việt Post Bank
 2015 Vietnam League -  Champion, with Thông tin Liên Việt Post Bank
 2016 Vietnam League -  Runner-Up, with Thông tin Liên Việt Post Bank
 2017 Vietnam League -  Runner-Up, with Thông tin Liên Việt Post Bank
 2018 Vietnam League -  Runner-Up, with Thông tin Liên Việt Post Bank
 2019 Vietnam League -  Champion, with Thông tin Liên Việt Post Bank
 2020 Vietnam League -  Champion, with Thông tin Liên Việt Post Bank
 2021 Vietnam League -  Champion, with Bộ Tư lệnh Thông tin - FLC

References

Vietnamese women's volleyball players
1990 births
Living people
People from Phú Thọ province
Vietnam women's international volleyball players
Southeast Asian Games silver medalists for Vietnam
Southeast Asian Games bronze medalists for Vietnam
Southeast Asian Games medalists in volleyball
Competitors at the 2017 Southeast Asian Games
Volleyball players at the 2018 Asian Games
Asian Games competitors for Vietnam
Setters (volleyball)
21st-century Vietnamese women